Kolonia Osieck  is a village in the administrative district of Gmina Osieck, within Otwock County, Masovian Voivodeship, in east-central Poland. As of 2015, it has a population of 148.

References

Kolonia Osieck